Pilar Schiavo is an American politician, nurse advocate, and labor activist currently serving in the California State Assembly representing the western San Fernando Valley, including Santa Clarita, Northridge, Chatsworth, Porter Ranch, and Granada Hills in California's 40th State Assembly district.

She defeated incumbent Republican Assemblywoman Suzette Valladares in the November 2022 election by 522 votes.

Early life 
Shiavo grew up in a working class home, where her father was a logger and her mother was a waitress.

References 

Living people
Year of birth missing (living people)
California Democrats